Thibault Campanini (born 27 July 1998) is a French professional footballer who plays as a right-back for Ajaccio II.

Club career
Campanini was born in Marseille and signed for Gazélec Ajaccio from rivals AC Ajaccio in 2016. He made his debut on 10 March 2017, playing 80 minutes in a 3–1 win over Troyes.

Career statistics

Club

References

External links
 
 
 
 

Living people
1998 births
Footballers from Marseille
Association football defenders
French footballers
France youth international footballers
Olympique de Marseille players
Gazélec Ajaccio players
Paris FC players
Ligue 2 players
Championnat National players